= Geert Leus =

Dutch scientist

Geert Leus from the Delft University of Technology, Delft, Netherlands was named Fellow of the Institute of Electrical and Electronics Engineers (IEEE) in 2012 for contributions to signal processing for communications.
